Dichocrocis atrisectalis is a moth in the family Crambidae. It was described by George Hampson in 1908. It is found in the Andaman Islands in the Bay of Bengal.

References

Moths described in 1908
Spilomelinae